Herbert Garbe (1 June 1888 – 17 July 1945) was a German sculptor. His work was part of the sculpture event in the art competition at the 1932 Summer Olympics.

Personal life
While living in France at the end of the Second World War, Garbe was imprisoned by French authorities due to his involvement with the Nazi Party. He died in a prisoner of war camp in Rennes on 17 July 1945.

References

1888 births
1945 deaths
20th-century German sculptors
20th-century German male artists
German male sculptors
Olympic competitors in art competitions
People from Berlin
German people who died in prison custody
Prisoners who died in French detention
Nazi Party members
Nazis who died in prison custody